FC Lero is a Timorese football club based in Iliomar, Lautém District. The team played in LFA Segunda 2019.

History
In 2019, the team played in LFA Segunda. The team finished the competition in sixth place in group B with only 1 win, 1 draw, and 3 defeats, and was relegated to LFA Terceira. Confusingly, this division has a team of a similar name, AS Lero (Lautém).

Due to the 2019-2021 COVID-19 pandemic, the Liga Futeból Timor-Leste (LFTL) canceled the three divisions of the LFA.

Taça 12 de Novembro
In 2019, FC Lero played in the Taça 12 de Novembro but was eliminated from the competition in the first phase after being defeated by the FC Lica-Lica Lemorai with a final score of 2 to 1.

References

Football clubs in East Timor
Football
Association football clubs established in 2019